= The Bengali Movement Theatre =

The Bengali Movement Theatre is a unique and a collaborative complex style of the post modern performing and visual arts, which was created by Dr Mukid Choudhury in 1997. The Bengali Movement Theatre uses live performers to present the experience of a real or imagined event before a live audience in a specific place. The performers may communicate this experience to the audience through combinations of dance, gesture, speech, song, music, drama, text, cinema and media from Bengali diverse sources into a complex performance.

== Examples of The Bengali Movement Theatre ==
- Koto Rang [The colour of life, 2011], Ekti Ashare Shopno [A Midsummer Night's Dream, 2012], Oprakritir prakriti [The Consequence, 2013].
- puran kothar shuk-pakhi (1998), sresti (1999), nuton diganto (2001), shada-kalu (2004), vumi-putra (2006), kobi kathan (2006), dakatiya nadi (2006), bibiyana (2006), dawal (2009).
- Trespasser (1997), Waves in Rhythm (1996), Call of a flute (1998), War with Winds (1998), Monsoon (1999), Huimonti (2014), Ekti Ashare Shopno (2014), Ochin Diper Upakhyan (2014).
- The Bengali Movement Theatre Festival 2006, 2012 and 2014
